Mari Rantanen (born 29 March 1976) is a Finnish politician currently serving in the Parliament of Finland for the Finns Party at the Helsinki constituency.

References

1976 births
Living people
Social Democratic Party of Finland politicians
Finns Party politicians
Members of the Parliament of Finland (2019–23)
21st-century Finnish women politicians
Women members of the Parliament of Finland